The men's tournament of field hockey at the 2013 Summer Universiade was held from July 7 to 15 in Kazan, Russia.

Preliminary round

Group A

Group B

Classification

9th-place game

7th-place game

5th-place game

Final round

Bronze-medal match

Gold-medal match

Final standings

References

Men